The , also known as Porotokotan, is a former museum in Shiraoi, Hokkaidō, Japan. The facility began its existence in 1976 as the Shiraoi Foundation for the Preservation of Ainu Culture. In 1984 this was extended to include the Ainu Folk Museum. In 1990 it reopened under the auspices of The Ainu Museum Foundation. The collection included some five thousand folk materials relating to the Ainu and a further approximately two hundred objects relating to minority groups of the north, including the Nivkh, Uilta, Sami, and Inuit. The institution was also involved in the recording and transmission of Ainu-related intangible cultural heritage. The museum closed to make way for the new National Ainu Museum on 31 March 2018.

See also
 Nibutani Ainu Culture Museum
 Historical Museum of the Saru River
 Hakodate City Museum of Northern Peoples

References

External links

  Ainu Museum

Museums in Hokkaido
Defunct museums in Japan
Shiraoi, Hokkaido
Museums established in 1984
1984 establishments in Japan
Museums disestablished in 2018
2018 disestablishments in Japan
Ainu
Ethnic museums